Antecume Pata is a village in French Guiana, France. It was founded by André Cognat, a Pierre-Bénite-born Wayana tribal chief. It is home to a nursery and primary state school. Even though French is taught at the school, Sranan Tongo is still the lingua franca (common language) in the region.

Geography 

Notes

References 

Indigenous villages in French Guiana
Maripasoula
Villages in French Guiana
Islands of French Guiana